The paleontological site of Cerin is a fossil deposit of the Jura Mountains located in Cerin, a hamlet belonging to the commune of Marchamp in the department of Ain. The site is internationally known for its surprising diversity.

The deposits are located in what was a tropical lagoon at the end of the Kimmeridgian age (Late Jurassic). It is dated from the Aulacostephanus pseudomutabilis biozone, whose equivalent in the Mediterranean area is the Aulacostephanus eudoxus biozone, who dates back to 153 Ma.

Situation

The paleontological site is located in Cerin, a hamlet belonging to the commune of Marchamp, in Ain. The town, belonging to the Bugey historical region, was erected at 560 meters above sea level, and is located at 20 km of Belley, 75 km of Lyon, 80 km of Grenoble and 90 km of Geneva.

Lithographic limestone

Cerin was reputed by the end of the 19th century for the quality of its lithographic limestone. The area was, during the Late Jurassic, a tropical lagoon. Lithographic limestone is formed by sedimentation of a very thin carbonated mud deposited at the bottom of a lagoon 153 million of years ago. Those deposits are disposed in strata.

The quarry exploitation, which began in 1835 during the lithography golden age, allowed to periodically uncover prints of prehistoric animals and plants fossilized in stone. Paleontology was at its beginning and those discoveries were still little-known.

Site discovery

In 1838, thanks to the engineer Aimé Drian, a passionate amateur geologist, and lyonese geologist, among which Victor Thiollière, those fossils were discovered and the existence of the paleontological site of Cerin was revealed to the scientific world. The site obtains an international reputation and rival with the Solnhofen Limestone, in Bavaria. Until his death, Victor Thiollière never ceased to collect and study a maximum of fossils from the site, and it was, in large part, thanks to his study of the Cerin fossils that he was recognized in the palaeontology world.

His works showed the similarities of the lithographic limestones of Cerin and Solnhofen. He described several new species of fish. He published in 1854 the first part of his "Description des poissons fossiles provenant des gisements coralliens du Jura dans le Bugey" ("Description of the fossil fish from the Jura corallian deposits in the Bugey"), but died shortly before the publication of the second part, the descriptions and lithographic plates already finished.

Research on site

Researches on this Late Kimmeridgian site (Late Jurassic, around -153 Ma), from 1975 to 1995, were a unique operation and involved advanced technology. Directed by geologist from the Claude Bernard University in Lyon, it necessitated heavy equipment of civil engineering.

This operation allowed the discovery of algae, ferns, conifers, molluscs, sea urchins, starfish, crustaceans such as the holotypes of Cyclerion bourseaui and Soleryon amicalis, reptiles, fish, as well as tracks of turtles and other reptiles. A thorough study permitted to determine the age and nature of the site (a tropical lagoon 153 million of years old) and to understand the reasons of this exceptional fossilization.

A one-of-a-kind Late Jurassic fossilized track of prehistoric marine turtle was discovered in Cerin.

Fossilization process in Cerin 

To understand the fossilization process in Cerin, scientists went on expedition to Aldabra in the Indian Ocean, to observe a fossilization process similar to the one who happened on the site.

153 millions of years ago, the climate was tropical. The lagoon had only few contacts with the open sea, and evaporation was intense. Terrestrial animals venturing in the lagoon shores left their tracks in a quickly drying mud.

During storms, a large quantity of saltwater, carrying mud, vegetal remains, and dead or alive animals, entered the lagoon ; clearwater, brought by rains and water runoff, brought as well large quantities of particulate matters. When the calm was settling, those fine particles deposited in a regular layer which carpeted the depths and covered remains and tracks.

This layer gave then birth to a strata of lithographic limestone.

When evaporation made the water level drop again, it became under oxygenated and over-concentrated on salt, which led to the death of many living beings, while protecting their bodies from scavengers. The microbial mats, who thrived in this environment, covered the corpses and vegetal remains, helping their conservation as fossils.

Museum
The Musée des Confluences showcase 24 fossils from Cerin, some of them found by Victor Thiollière ;
The Musée paléoécologique de Cerin ;
The Museum of Natural Sciences showcase casts of fossils from the site of Cerin.des moulages de fossiles issus du site de Cerin ;
The Teylers Museum in Haarlem (Netherlands) showcase fossils from Cerin.

See also 
 Solnhofen Limestone
 Canjuers Lagerstätte
 Mörnsheim Formation

References

Bibliography & further reading 
 Victor Thiollière, Descriptions des poissons fossiles provenant des gisements coralliens du Jura dans le Bugey, Paris, Editions J.-B. Baillière, 1854.
 Victor Thiollière et Paul Gervais, Descriptions des poissons fossiles provenant des gisements coralliens du Jura dans le Bugey. 2e partie. Revue et annotée par Paul Gervais avec l’aide de Gaston de Saporta, Falsan et Dumortier, Lyon, Éditions H. Georg, 1873.
 Louis David, Une lagune tropicale au temps des dinosaures, édition du CNRS, 1985.

External links 
 La vie au Kimmeridgien... à Cerin on the Planet-Terre website.

Geologic formations of France
Jurassic System of Europe
Limestone formations
Lagoonal deposits
Fossiliferous stratigraphic units of Europe
Paleontology in France
Ain